Professional ice hockey in Connecticut has a rich tradition dating from the mid-1920s. Most of these teams were NHL minor league affiliates located in New Haven, though with the closure of the New Haven Coliseum, minor league affiliates now exist only exist in Hartford and Bridgeport. Hartford had its own Major league team, the Whalers team that existed in Hartford from 1974-97. Independent hockey leagues teams have also been gaining a foothold in Danbury starting in 2004.

This article concludes with a summary of all past and present hockey teams from Connecticut, listed by city and league for reference, and to provide links to main articles about each team.

History

New Haven/Bridgeport
Minor League teams include player-development franchises affiliated with NHL teams, as well as independent (non-affiliate) teams

While New Haven has no currently active teams, New Haven has long been considered the birthplace of hockey in Connecticut.  Teams have been hosted since the mid-1920s, first at the New Haven Arena until 1972 (demolished 1975), and  followed by the New Haven Coliseum until 2002 (demolished in 2007).  The New Haven Haven Blades (1954–72) and later the New Haven Nighthawks (1972–93) were the most popular franchises. Since the Coliseum's closure in 2002, professional hockey has not returned to New Haven. The American Hockey League Sound Tigers have played in nearby Bridgeport since 2001.

In 1992, the Nighthawks signed a last-minute player-development affiliation with the Ottawa Senators, which required the team to be re-branded as the New Haven Senators for the 1992–93 season. Fans were ambivalent to the name change and attendance plummeted, making this the franchise last season in New Haven.

Hockey had a brief reboot with the arrival of former Hartford Whalers' affiliate, the Beast of New Haven (formerly the Carolina Monarchs), which were displaced from North Carolina by their parent team's relocation in 1997.  They were followed by a two seasons of the independent New Haven Knights from 2000–02. Following the Knights' departure, however, chronic maintenance issues in the New Haven Coliseum, as well as competition from other southern Connecticut arenas, prompted state and city officials to permanently close the arena in 2002. Demolition of the Coliseum was completed in throughout 2006, concluded by the implosion of the signature elevated parking garage on January 20, 2007.

The Bridgeport Sound Tigers begin play in the AHL in 2001, in the newly constructed Arena at Harbor Yard. During the first season of play, the Sound Tigers won their division championship and played in the Calder Cup Finals, though ultimately losing to the Chicago Wolves four games to one. As of the 2009 season, the team had seven winning seasons. Located 20 miles west of the New Haven Coliseum, competition from the Arena at Harbor Yard was one of the factors in the coliseum's demise. In 2021, the team was rebranded the Bridgeport Islanders after their long time NHL affiliate the New York Islanders.

Hartford
Major league teams are franchises that played in the National Hockey League or the World Hockey Association
Hartford, the capital of Connecticut, was bereft of a professional ice hockey team until 1974, when the Whalers franchise from the World Hockey Association came to town, occupying the newly built Hartford Civic Center.  After the Whalers relocated to North Carolina in 1997, the minor league team the Hartford Wolf Pack relocated to the Civic Center.  In the years since, various proposals for a new arena have been submitted with the hope of attracting a new major league hockey team.

Major league 

The former Hartford Whalers were the first and only major league hockey team located in Connecticut, nestled halfway between the Boston Bruins and New York Rangers/Islanders hockey markets. The team was founded in Boston as the New England Whalers, one of the original World Hockey Association teams (from whose initials "WHA" inspired the Whaler's name).  The WHA planned for a rival team to play in New York on Long Island, however the NHL created the Islanders franchise to fill the desired arena, shutting them out of the market.

The Whalers moved to Hartford in 1974, and entered the NHL in 1979, where it became the Hartford Whalers. Although it had losing seasons its first two years in Hartford, the team had won the 1972–73 WHA championship while in Boston and, never missed the playoffs while in the WHA. The team had mixed success in the NHL before relocating to Raleigh, North Carolina in 1997 due to attendance and revenue issues.

Post NHL
Note: this section describes actions taken by third parties that are not affiliated with the Whalers/Hurricanes franchise

Years after the departure of the Whalers, the team remains a focus of civic pride among Connecticut residents. The retired jersey numbers still hang on green and white banner from the rafters of the former Hartford Civic Center (now called the XL Center) where the team played in Hartford. Aside from the jersey numbers officially retired by the team, the banners include former team members Ulf Samuelsson (#5), Gordie Howe (#9), Ron Francis (#10), and Kevin Dineen (#11), which were symbolically added by Hartford Wolf Pack management in honor of the players in 2006, nine years after the team departure.

Many fans have continued to follow the team after its move to North Carolina, however some have boycotted the team as former players from Hartford were traded to other teams or retired. Loyalty remains focused on the team's Hartford years, with new Whalers merchandise sales alone among the highest selling brands in the NHL as of August 2010. This continued popularity throughout the intervening years has led to many efforts to bring NHL Hockey back to Hartford by individuals such as Hartford real estate magnate and former XL Center operator Larry Gottesdiener and former Whalers franchise owner Howard Baldwin.

Efforts to attract new NHL Team

Several efforts have been made over the years to revive NHL hockey by promoting the Hartford market for a new or relocated NHL franchise.
Larry Gottesdiener, head of Northland Investment Group, has scouted for years for an NHL franchise to bring to Hartford. Northland, a firm heavily invested in Hartford real estate, jointly operated XL Center from 2007–10. Gottesdiener hoped to bring a new team temporarily to the XL Center until a modern arena could be built in a possible deal with the state. The new team would have likely been named after the Whalers, as at least some of the logos associated with the "Whalers" franchise were registered by Northland until 2009, when the registration with the patent office expired. Northland has since divested of its share in the XL Center, and appears to have abandoned its attempts to attract an NHL team.

Former Whalers owner Howard Baldwin has sponsored numerous events such the Whalers Reunion and Fan Fest in August 2010 featuring charitable events and appearances by former players. His company planned the Whalers Hockey Fest and Whale Bowl, a hockey festival in East Hartford, Connecticut at Rentschler Field held in February 2011. The festival featured over 20 outdoor high school and college hockey games and an AHL Outdoor Classic contest featuring the Connecticut Whale and the Providence Bruins.

Minor League 

After the NHL team, the Hartford Whalers, left for North Carolina in 1997, the minor league Hartford Wolf Pack relocated from Binghamton, NY to Hartford.  The Wolf Pack had a previous relationship with Hartford in the 1980s as the Whaler's AHL affiliate, the Binghamton Whalers, until they started their current affiliation with New York Rangers in 1990.  In 2010, the team announced it was changing its name to the Connecticut Whale, to honor hockey tradition in Hartford started by the Whalers.  The name reverted to the Wolf Pack in 2012.

Danbury
Danbury has a fairly short history of minor league hockey from mostly independent leagues (no affiliation with the NHL).  Most of the teams succumbed to budget and management problems. Danbury teams played at the Danbury Ice Arena, built in 1999 and renovated in 2004 just before the Danbury Trashers began play.

The Danbury Whalers of the Federal Hockey League (FHL) were named in honor of the former Hartford Whalers NHL hockey team. The team and the FHL league have no affiliation with the NHL or any NHL franchise. The Danbury Titans replaced the Whalers in the FHL in the 2015–16 season but would also fold after two seasons

Numbers that have been retired

Summary of franchises by city

Bridgeport

Danbury

Hartford

New Haven

References 

Ice hockey in Connecticut
Sports in Hartford, Connecticut
Sports in New Haven, Connecticut
Ice hockey